Ragnvald Maseng (21 October 1891 – 4 July 1920) was a Norwegian sport shooter. He was born in Askim, and his club was Christiania Skytterlag. He competed in military rifle and small-bore rifle at the 1912 Summer Olympics in Stockholm. Maseng drowned while trying to wade across a river on the Hardangervidda.

References

1891 births
1920 deaths
People from Askim
Shooters at the 1912 Summer Olympics
Olympic shooters of Norway
Norwegian male sport shooters
Sportspeople from Viken (county)
20th-century Norwegian people